Peter Rowley is a New Zealand comic actor.

Peter Rowley may also refer to:

Peter Rowley, namesake of Rowleys Bay, Wisconsin

See also
Peter Rowley-Conwy (born 1951), British archaeologist